This list of churches in Rogaland is a list of the Church of Norway churches in Rogaland county, Norway.  The churches are all part of the Diocese of Stavanger.  The diocese is based at the Stavanger Cathedral in the city of Stavanger.

The list is divided into nine sections, one for each Deanery in the county. Administratively each deanery is divided up into church council districts which usually correspond to the municipalities within each deanery. Each municipal church council may be made up of more than one parish, each of which may have their own council. Each parish may have one or more congregations in it. The municipality of Stavanger is a special case since it has a large population and a large area.  The central part of the city is its own deanery and the areas surrounding the city centre belong to a different deanery, and the outlying island areas belong to another deanery. The number, size, and compositions of the deaneries in the diocese have changed over time, most recently in 2013 when two deaneries were merged to form the new Ryfylke deanery.

Stavanger domprosti 
This arch-deanery covers the central part of the city of Stavanger in Rogaland county.  The deanery is headquartered at the Stavanger Cathedral in the city of Stavanger in the western part of Stavanger municipality. This deanery has been around since the Middle ages. On 7 November 1924, the deanery was divided with the areas in the city of Stavanger remaining in the Stavanger domprosti and the rest of the old deanery was created as the new Hetland prosti (later renamed Søre Ryfylke prosti) which included the central parts of the county.

Dalane prosti 
This deanery covers the southern part of Rogaland county, including the municipalities of Eigersund, Bjerkreim, Sokndal, and Lund.  The deanery is headquartered in the town of Egersund in Eigersund municipality.  The deanery was created in the middle ages, and its borders have changed very few times since then. On 1 January 1825, the Flekkefjord and Hitterø parishes were transferred out of Dalane prosti to the neighboring Lister prosti. In 1862, the Bakke and Sirdal parishes were transferred out of Dalane prosti and into the neighboring Flekkefjord prosti. In 1988, the Ogna parish was transferred to the neighboring Jæren prosti.

Haugaland prosti 
This deanery covers the northwestern part of Rogaland county, including the municipalities of Haugesund, Bokn, Tysvær, Utsira, and Vindafjord.  The deanery is headquartered in the town of Haugesund in the municipality of Haugesund.

The deanery was historically called Karmsund prosti, a deanery dating back to the middle ages.  It historically encompassed all of the areas surrounding the Karmsund strait, west of Ryfylke.  By 2006, the membership of the deanery had grown so large, it was divided into two: all of the parishes in the municipality of Karmøy were moved to the new Karmøy prosti and the rest remained in the deanery which was renamed Haugesund prosti. In 2013, the parishes from Vindafjord were moved here, and the deanery was renamed Haugaland prosti.

Jæren prosti 
This deanery covers the west-central part of Rogaland county, south of the city of Stavanger, including the municipalities of Gjesdal, Hå, Klepp, and Time.  The deanery is headquartered in the town of Bryne in the municipality of Time.  There is one parish in this deanery that crosses municipal boundary lines.  The Frøyland og Orstad parish includes parts of both Time and Klepp municipalities.  This is the only such parish in Norway.

Prior to 1922, the deanery was called . The deanery of Jæren has been around since the middle ages and it has always included the coastal areas south of the city of Stavanger. In 1988, the parishes of Randaberg and Høle transferred from Ryfylke prosti to Jæren prosti and the Ogna parish was transferred from Dalane prosti to Jæren.  On 1 May 1997, the parishes in Sola and Sandnes municipalities were separated from Jæren deanery to form the new Sandnes prosti.

Karmøy prosti 
This deanery covers the municipality of Karmøy which includes the island of Karmøy and a small area on the mainland of northwestern Rogaland county.  The deanery is headquartered in the village of Avaldsnes in the municipality of Karmøy.  The deanery was created on 1 January 2006 when it was split off from the old Karmsund prosti.  The remainder of the old deanery was renamed Haugesund prosti.

Ryfylke prosti 
This deanery covers the northeastern part of Rogaland county, including the municipalities of Sauda, Suldal, Hjelmeland, and Strand.  The deanery is headquartered in the village of Hjelmelandsvågen in the municipality of Hjelmeland.

Historically, there was a Ryfylke deanery since the Middle Ages.  Over time, its boundaries were changed and moved. On 1 March 1988, the deanery was renamed Nordre Ryfylke prosti (and at the same time, the old Hetland prosti was renamed Søre Ryfylke prosti). Also on that date, Hjelmeland was transferred from Nordre Ryfylke to Søre Ryfylke. In 2013, Nordre Ryfylke prosti and Søre Ryfylke prosti were merged to form the present Ryfylke prosti. In 2020, the Forsand area was moved from here to the neighboring Sandnes prosti.

Sandnes prosti 
This deanery covers the municipality of Sandnes in the west-central part of Rogaland county.  The deanery is headquartered in the town of Sandnes.  The deanery was created in 1998 when the parishes in Sola and Sandnes municipalities were removed from the deanery of Jæren.  In 2006, the parishes in Sola were transferred to the Tungenes deanery, leaving just the parishes in Sandnes in this deanery. In 2020, the Forsand area was moved from Ryfylke prosti to this one.

Tungenes prosti 
This deanery covers the central part of Rogaland county, in the area around the Boknafjorden.  It includes the municipalities of Randaberg, Kvitsøy, and Sola, plus the eastern island portion of Stavanger.  The deanery is headquartered in the village of Randaberg in the municipality of Randaberg.  The deanery was created in 1998 when the parishes in Randaberg and Kvitsøy were removed from Jæren prosti along with six parishes from the Stavanger domprosti (Madlamark, Hafrsfjord, Sunde, Tasta, Vardeneset, and Tjensvoll).  In 2006, several other changes took place:  Tjensvoll was moved to the new Ytre Stavanger prosti, all of the parishes in Sola were moved here from Sandnes prosti, and all of the parishes in Rennesøy and Finnøy were moved here from Søre Ryfylke prosti.

Ytre Stavanger prosti 
This deanery covers the outer parts of the city of Stavanger in western Stavanger Municipality in Rogaland county. The deanery is headquartered in Madlamark in the western part of the city of Stavanger.  This deanery was created on 1 January 2006 when five parishes from Tungenes deanery (Madlamark, Hafrsfjord, Sunde, Tasta, and Vardeneset) and three parishes from Stavanger arch-deanery (Hinna, Hillevåg, and Gausel) were combined to form a new deanery that surrounds the city centre of Stavanger.

References

 
Rogaland